The Bahamas cricket team toured Bermuda in July 2019 to play a 50-over match followed by a four-match Twenty20 series. The fixtures were part of Bermuda's preparation for hosting and participating in the Americas Regional Qualifying Finals tournament for the 2019 ICC T20 World Cup Qualifier.

The matches in the T20 series would have been the first fixtures with Twenty20 International status to be played by either team since the International Cricket Council announced that all Twenty20 matches played between Associate Members from 1 January 2019 would have full T20I status, although Bermuda had previously played three T20Is during the 2008 ICC World Twenty20 Qualifier. However the matches were not granted T20I status. Bermuda won every match of the tour.

Squads

50-over match

T20 series

1st T20

2nd T20

3rd T20

4th T20

References

Associate international cricket competitions in 2019
International cricket tours of Bermuda